Robert Hoxie Rutford (January 26, 1933 – December 1, 2019) was a president emeritus and a former faculty member of the University of Texas at Dallas. He was the second president of the University of Texas at Dallas (from 1982 until 1994).

He has been noted for his geological research on Antarctica.

Rutford was a member of several United States Antarctic Program expeditions to Antarctica, and was the leader of the University of Minnesota Ellsworth Mountains Party, 1963–1964. Rutford served as director of the Division of Polar Programs of the National Science Foundation from 1975 to 1977.

The 14,688 foot/4,477 meter-high Mount Rutford, which is the summit of Craddock Massif in the Sentinel Range of the Ellsworth Mountains in the Antarctic, was named for him in 2007.  The 130 mile-long Rutford Ice Stream, a "mile-thick, fast flowing stream" which  drains part of the West Antarctic ice sheet into the sea, had previously been named for him.

Rutford served as the head football coach at Hamline University in St. Paul, Minnesota, from 1958 to 1961.

References

1933 births
2019 deaths
Hamline Pipers football coaches
Presidents of the University of Texas at Dallas
Chancellors of the University of Nebraska-Lincoln